The 1933–34 British Ice Hockey season consisted of English League and a Scottish League.

English League
The league in England was won by Grosvenor House Canadians.

Scottish League
Kelvingrove won the championship and received the Canada Cup.

Scores

Table

Mitchell Trophy

Results

President's Pucks

Results

References 

British